Clifty Creek Power Plant is a 1,300-MW coal-fired power station located in Madison, Indiana. Clifty Creek is operated by the Indiana Kentucky Electric Corporation. It is named after Clifty Creek, which enters the Ohio River nearby.

Background
Five of its six identical units began operating in 1955; the sixth unit was launched in 1956. Its six units supplied electricity for the Portsmouth Gaseous Diffusion Plant in Piketon, Ohio along with its sister plant, Kyger Creek Power Plant in Gallia County, Ohio.

Pollution control systems were installed at Clifty Creek in 2001 to reduce nitrogen oxide emissions by 80%. With all of its units dating back to mid-1950s, the plant ranked 73rd on the United States list of dirtiest power plants in terms of sulfur dioxide emissions per megawatt-hour of electrical energy produced in 2013.  However, with the addition of two jet bubbling reactor flue gas desulfurization (FGD) systems in 2013, 98% of sulfur dioxide is now removed.

The facility does not adequately prevent groundwater pollution from its coal ash, and for that reason, the United States Environmental Protection Agency has proposed denying its permit to continue operation. For this reason, the plant faces closure.

Transmission Lines

The plant is connected to the power grid by 6 345-kv lines and 3 138-kv lines.  1 345-kv line goes to the Trimble County Power Plant, which is an interconnection with Louisville Gas & Electric. 1 short 345-kv line connects with the nearby American Electric Power Jefferson 765-kv Station.  Finally, 2 double-circuit 345 lines connect with the Pierce Substation in Ohio; on the way, one of the 2 double-circuit lines connects with the AEP and Duke 345-kv network near Lawrenceburg, Indiana, via the Dearborn substation.

See also

 List of power stations in Indiana
 Clifty Falls State Park

References

External links 
 Chimney Diagram
 Aerial view of the surrounding area

Energy infrastructure completed in 1955
Energy infrastructure completed in 1956
Towers completed in 1955
Chimneys in the United States
Coal-fired power stations in Indiana
Buildings and structures in Jefferson County, Indiana
1955 establishments in Indiana